Lisa Westcott Wilkins  is an archaeologist and co-founder and managing director of DigVentures. She was elected as a fellow of the Society of Antiquaries of London on 13 February 2020.

References

External links
'Digventures interview (featuring Lisa Wesctoss Wilkins) with The Archaeologist magazine, Summer 2012'

Living people
Year of birth missing (living people)
Fellows of the Society of Antiquaries of London
British women archaeologists